Gorny (masculine), Gornaya (feminine), or Gornoye (neuter) is the name of several inhabited localities in Russia.

Modern localities

Altai Krai
As of 2013, one rural locality in Altai Krai bears this name:
Gorny, Altai Krai, a settlement in Ust-Ishinsky Selsoviet of Krasnogorsky District;

Amur Oblast
As of 2013, one rural locality in Amur Oblast bears this name:
Gorny, Amur Oblast, a settlement in Gornensky Rural Settlement of Zeysky District

Republic of Bashkortostan
As of 2013, five rural localities in the Republic of Bashkortostan bear this name:
Gorny, Arkhangelsky District, Republic of Bashkortostan, a village in Arkh-Latyshsky Selsoviet of Arkhangelsky District
Gorny, Chishminsky District, Republic of Bashkortostan, a selo in Kara-Yakupovsky Selsoviet of Chishminsky District
Gorny, Kushnarenkovsky District, Republic of Bashkortostan, a village in Kushnarenkovsky Selsoviet of Kushnarenkovsky District
Gorny, Tuymazinsky District, Republic of Bashkortostan, a village in Starotuymazinsky Selsoviet of Tuymazinsky District
Gornoye, Republic of Bashkortostan, a village in Urgushevsky Selsoviet of Karaidelsky District

Bryansk Oblast
As of 2013, one rural locality in Bryansk Oblast bears this name:
Gorny, Bryansk Oblast, a settlement in Gartsevsky Rural Administrative Okrug of Starodubsky District;

Republic of Buryatia
As of 2013, one rural locality in the Republic of Buryatia bears this name:
Gorny, Republic of Buryatia, a settlement under the administrative jurisdiction of Kamensk Urban-Type Settlement in Kabansky District

Chelyabinsk Oblast
As of 2013, four rural localities in Chelyabinsk Oblast bear this name:
Gorny, Miass, Chelyabinsk Oblast, a settlement under the administrative jurisdiction of the City of Miass
Gorny, Agapovsky District, Chelyabinsk Oblast, a settlement in Svetlogorsky Selsoviet of Agapovsky District
Gorny, Argayashsky District, Chelyabinsk Oblast, a settlement in Ayazgulovsky Selsoviet of Argayashsky District
Gornaya, a village in Velikopetrovsky Selsoviet of Kartalinsky District

Irkutsk Oblast
As of 2013, one rural locality in Irkutsk Oblast bears this name:
Gorny, Irkutsk Oblast, a settlement in Irkutsky District

Jewish Autonomous Oblast
As of 2013, one rural locality in the Jewish Autonomous Oblast bears this name:
Gornoye, Jewish Autonomous Oblast, a selo in Leninsky District

Kaluga Oblast
As of 2013, one rural locality in Kaluga Oblast bears this name:
Gornoye, Kaluga Oblast, a village in Meshchovsky District

Khabarovsk Krai
As of 2013, one urban locality in Khabarovsk Krai bears this name:
Gorny, Khabarovsk Krai, a work settlement in Solnechny District

Khanty-Mansi Autonomous Okrug
As of 2013, one rural locality in Khanty-Mansi Autonomous Okrug bears this name:
Gorny, Khanty-Mansi Autonomous Okrug, a settlement in Surgutsky District

Krasnodar Krai
As of 2013, three rural localities in Krasnodar Krai bear this name:
Gorny, Novorossiysk, Krasnodar Krai, a khutor in Verkhnebakansky Rural Okrug under the administrative jurisdiction of Primorsky City District of the City of Novorossiysk
Gorny, Tuapsinsky District, Krasnodar Krai, a settlement in Shaumyansky Rural Okrug of Tuapsinsky District
Gornoye, Krasnodar Krai, a selo in Akhmetovsky Rural Okrug of Labinsky District

Krasnoyarsk Krai
As of 2013, one rural locality in Krasnoyarsk Krai bears this name:
Gorny, Krasnoyarsk Krai, a settlement in Gorny Selsoviet of Achinsky District

Novgorod Oblast
As of 2013, two rural localities in Novgorod Oblast bear this name:
Gorny, Novgorod Oblast, a settlement in Antsiferovskoye Settlement of Khvoyninsky District
Gornoye, Novgorod Oblast, a village in Molvotitskoye Settlement of Maryovsky District

Novosibirsk Oblast
As of 2013, two inhabited localities in Novosibirsk Oblast bear this name:

Urban localities
Gorny, Toguchinsky District, Novosibirsk Oblast, a work settlement in Toguchinsky District

Rural localities
Gorny, Moshkovsky District, Novosibirsk Oblast, a settlement in Moshkovsky District

Orenburg Oblast
As of 2013, four rural localities in Orenburg Oblast bear this name:
Gorny, Asekeyevsky District, Orenburg Oblast, a settlement in Ryazanovsky Selsoviet of Asekeyevsky District
Gorny, Krasnogvardeysky District, Orenburg Oblast, a settlement in Yashkinsky Selsoviet of Krasnogvardeysky District
Gorny, Novosergiyevsky District, Orenburg Oblast, a settlement in Kuvaysky Selsoviet of Novosergiyevsky District
Gorny, Orenburgsky District, Orenburg Oblast, a settlement in Gorny Selsoviet of Orenburgsky District

Perm Krai
As of 2013, two rural localities in Perm Krai bear this name:
Gorny, Permsky District, Perm Krai, two settlements in Permsky District

Primorsky Krai
As of 2013, three rural localities in Primorsky Krai bear this name:
Gorny, Primorsky Krai, a settlement in Kirovsky District
Gornoye, Mikhaylovsky District, Primorsky Krai, a settlement in Mikhaylovsky District
Gornoye, Nadezhdinsky District, Primorsky Krai, a settlement in Nadezhdinsky District

Rostov Oblast
As of 2013, two inhabited localities in Rostov Oblast bear this name:

Urban localities
Gorny, Krasnosulinsky District, Rostov Oblast, a work settlement in Krasnosulinsky District

Rural localities
Gorny, Semikarakorsky District, Rostov Oblast, a settlement in Bolshemechetnovskoye Rural Settlement of Semikarakorsky District

Sakhalin Oblast
As of 2013, two rural localities in Sakhalin Oblast bear this name:
Gornoye, Kurilsky District, Sakhalin Oblast, a selo in Kurilsky District
Gornoye, Makarovsky District, Sakhalin Oblast, a selo in Makarovsky District

Samara Oblast
As of 2013, one rural locality in Samara Oblast bears this name:
Gorny, Samara Oblast, a settlement in Koshkinsky District

Saratov Oblast
As of 2013, three inhabited localities in Saratov Oblast bear this name:

Urban localities
Gorny, Krasnopartizansky District, Saratov Oblast, a work settlement in Krasnopartizansky District

Rural localities
Gorny, Ozinsky District, Saratov Oblast, a settlement in Ozinsky District
Gorny, Volsky District, Saratov Oblast, a settlement in Volsky District

Stavropol Krai
As of 2013, four rural localities in Stavropol Krai bear this name:
Gorny, Budyonnovsky District, Stavropol Krai, a khutor in Krasnooktyabrsky Selsoviet of Budyonnovsky District
Gorny, Novoselitsky District, Stavropol Krai, a khutor in Novomayaksky Selsoviet of Novoselitsky District
Gorny, Petrovsky District, Stavropol Krai, a settlement in Rogato-Balkovsky Selsoviet of Petrovsky District
Gorny, Predgorny District, Stavropol Krai, a settlement in Yessentuksky Selsoviet of Predgorny District

Sverdlovsk Oblast
As of 2013, two rural localities in Sverdlovsk Oblast bear this name:
Gorny, Garinsky District, Sverdlovsk Oblast, a settlement in Garinsky District
Gorny, Kamensky District, Sverdlovsk Oblast, a settlement in Kamensky District

Tula Oblast
As of 2013, one rural locality in Tula Oblast bears this name:
Gorny, Tula Oblast, a settlement in Boryatinsky Rural Okrug of Volovsky District

Ulyanovsk Oblast
As of 2013, one rural locality in Ulyanovsk Oblast bears this name:
Gorny, Ulyanovsk Oblast, a settlement in Fabrichno-vyselkovsky Rural Okrug of Novospassky District

Vologda Oblast
As of 2013, one rural locality in Vologda Oblast bears this name:
Gornoye, Vologda Oblast, a village in Staroselsky Selsoviet of Vologodsky District

Yaroslavl Oblast
As of 2013, one rural locality in Yaroslavl Oblast bears this name:
Gorny, Yaroslavl Oblast, a settlement in Lyubilkovsky Rural Okrug of Rostovsky District

Zabaykalsky Krai
As of 2013, one urban locality in Zabaykalsky Krai bears this name:
Gorny, Zabaykalsky Krai, an urban-type settlement in Ulyotovsky District

Abolished localities
Gorny, Volgograd Oblast, a settlement in Gornopolyansky Selsoviet under the administrative jurisdiction of Sovetsky City District under the administrative jurisdiction of the city of oblast significance of Volgograd in Volgograd Oblast; abolished in March 2010

Alternative names
Gorny, alternative name of Tashkazgan, a settlement in Svetlogorsky Selsoviet of Agapovsky District in Chelyabinsk Oblast; 
Gorny, alternative name of Gornoye, a settlement in Mikhaylovsky District of Primorsky Krai
Gorny, alternative name of Gornoye, a settlement in Nadezhdinsky District of Primorsky Krai
Gornaya, alternative name of Gornaya Shaldikha, a village in Putilovskoye Settlement Municipal Formation of Kirovsky District in Leningrad Oblast; 
Gornoye, alternative name of Arkhangelskoye, a selo in Starooskolsky District of Belgorod Oblast; 
Gornoye, alternative name of Spas-Doshchaty, a selo in Mashonovskoye Rural Settlement of Zaraysky District in Moscow Oblast;